The 2015 New Zealand rugby league tour of England was a tour by the New Zealand national rugby league team. The New Zealand national rugby league team played a match against the Leeds Rhinos and competed in a three match test series against England for the Baskerville Shield, losing 2-1.

Background

New Zealand had originally intended to host a tour against France, while Australia was speculated to host a Great Britain Lions tour. However the Australian Rugby League Commission declined to host a tour and as an alternative the Rugby Football League invited the New Zealand Rugby League to tour Great Britain for a three match series.

New Zealand was last in the United Kingdom for the World Cup in 2013.

On 25 February 2015, the three test match venues were confirmed with Hull's KC Stadium hosting game one on 1 November, the London Olympic Stadium hosting the second test on 7 November and the final test match being held at Wigan's DW Stadium on 14 November.

The match against Leeds was the first time a Super League side had played a touring side since 2002, when the Kiwis played matches against Hull F.C. and St. Helens. It was the first time that Leeds played New Zealand since 1992. The match celebrated the 125th anniversary of Headingley Rugby Stadium. Leeds has defeated New Zealand once in eleven matches between the two teams.

Squad

Training squad
An initial training squad was named on 8 September 2015 and added to as teams were eliminated from the NRL finals. Kieran Foran was among those initially named but he later withdrew due to injury, joining Shaun Johnson, Thomas Leuluai, Manu Vatuvei, Dallin Watene-Zelezniak and Jared Warea-Hargreaves as being unavailable for the tour. Skipper Simon Mannering was also later made unavailable for the test series due to injury.

Final squad
The final touring squad of 23 players was named on 8 October.

On 10 October, Jason Taumalolo withdrew from the touring 23-man squad due to a knee injury. He was replaced by Manaia Cherrington. Curtis Rona left the tour after the second test match, returning to Australia to be present for the birth of his daughter.

Venues 
The four matches were played at the following venues in England.

Fixtures
New Zealand played four matches on tour, including three test matches against England. England also played a test match against France on 24 October.

Game 1

Gerard Beale was originally named to play but was replaced by Lewis Brown.

Test 1

Alex Glenn and Lewis Brown were named as 18th and 19th man respectively for the Kiwis.

Test 2

Stephen Kearney originally named Tuimoala Lolohea at halfback before selecting Kodi Nikorima to start the match.

Test 3

With the win, England retained the Baskerville Shield. Isaac Liu and Gerard Beale were 18th and 19th man respectively for New Zealand.

Aftermath
England's captain, Sean O'Loughlin was awarded the George Smith Medal as player of the series. This was England's first major series win in 8 years with their last win coming in the previous Kiwis tour of Great Britain.

References

New Zealand national rugby league team tours
Great Britain and France
New Zealand rugby league tour of Great Britain and France
Rugby league tours of Great Britain